Michael Gower Coleman (19 April 1939 – 17 December 2011) was the Roman Catholic bishop of the Roman Catholic Diocese of Port Elizabeth, South Africa.

Born in Mafeking, he was ordained to the priesthood in 1963. Coleman was named bishop of the Port Elizabeth diocese in 1986 resigning on August 20, 2011.
The Right Reverend Gower died shortly after stepping down, on December 17, 2011.

References

1939 births
2011 deaths
20th-century Roman Catholic bishops in South Africa
People from Port Elizabeth
21st-century Roman Catholic bishops in South Africa
Roman Catholic bishops of Port Elizabeth